Madhura Naranga is a 2015 Malayalam romantic family drama film written by Nishad Koya and Salam Kottakkal, directed by Sugeeth. The film says that it was adapted from a true incident. The film stars Kunchacko Boban, Biju Menon, Neeraj Madhav and debutante Parvathy Ratheesh in lead roles. The movie was well received by critics.

Plot
Jeevan (Kunchacko Boban) and Salim (Biju Menon) are taxi drivers in UAE. They live in a small villa in Sharjah which they share with Kumar (Neeraj Madhav). Jeevan while on duty encounters Thamara Muthulingam(Parvathy Ratheesh) who runs into his taxi and asks him to drive. Jeevan soon senses something is wrong as she does not provide a destination and seems suspicious. He drops her off at a beach and asks her leave which she does. The next day he finds her at the same beach again and approaches her. She explains that she is a Sri Lankan Tamil orphan who was tricked into joining a dance bar in Dubai. One night her sponsor confronts her in the dressing room after she runs away from the dance stage. She hits him in the head with a bottle in panic and runs off which is when she gets into Jeevan's taxi.

Jeevan sympathizes with her and lets her stay in his villa. His roommates are initially against it but later on warms up to her while Jeevan falls in love with her. Salim digs into her sponsor's fate and finds out he is still hospitalized and the police is on the lookout for her. Jeevan speaks with a friend Ashraf (Mithun Ramesh) to arrange for an accommodation for Thamara who reluctantly agrees to let her stay with his female workers. One night during a labour checking, Thamara returns to the villa with Jeevan. They coition. She then becomes pregnant and Jeevan arranges for her to stay in the villa. She delivers the baby at the villa itself with help of a friend's wife Deepa (Aparna Nair) who is a doctor.

Couple of years later, Jeevan meets with an accident and goes into a coma. Against his friends' wishes, Jeevan is transported to his hometown by a distant relative. At the same time, Thamara is arrested by the police at the behest of her sponsor and is later deported. Their infant son, Kannan, is sent to an orphanage while Salim is sentenced to six months imprisonment for aiding her illegally.

Sometime later, Jeevan who has now recovered arrives in Sri Lanka to find Thamara and is met by Salim. A London-based couple have shown interest in adopting Kannan. The only way to prevent this is if Jeevan and Thamara appear in the court together to receive him. Jeevan and Salim are not able to find Thamara and decide to return to UAE without her. On the way to the airport, they see a girl who has met with an accident surrounded by a crowd. The crowd stops their car and ask them to drop the bleeding girl at a nearby hospital. At the hospital, Jeevan finds Thamara taking care of other children. They are reunited and successfully get custody of Kannan from the UAE court.

Cast
 Kunchacko Boban as Jeevan
 Biju Menon as Saleemikka
 Neeraj Madhav as Kumar
 Parvathy Ratheesh as Thamara Muthulingam 
 Suraj Venjaramoodu as Kasargode Ibrahim (Icha)
 Aparna Nair as Gynaecologist Deepa
 Mithun Ramesh as Rafeeq
 Sadiq as Jamaalika
 Ganja Karuppu as a Sri Lankan Tamil tourist guide
 Shivaji Guruvayoor as Jeevan's uncle in a cameo role 
 Jaise Jose As Anil

Reception
Madhura Naranga opened to highly positive reviews from critics. Manorama Online said that "Madhura Naranga is one of the most outstanding movies in the non-classic genre".
The Times of India gave the film 3.5 out of 5 and stated "This Madhura Naranga would be a delicious pick for those who are looking for a movie with its layers of tastes well balanced". Sify gave it 3 out of 5 and wrote "If your idea of entertainment is a story coated with some melodrama, this one is a nice option".

Soundtrack
The film's background score and music is composed by Sreejith-Sachin(Yuvvh) For all lyrics written by Rajeev Nair.

References

External links

2015 films
2010s Malayalam-language films
2015 comedy films
Indian comedy films
Films shot in Sri Lanka
Films shot in Dubai
Films set in Sri Lanka
Films set in Dubai
Films directed by Sugeeth